Leederville is a locality within the City of Vincent in the Perth metropolitan region of Western Australia.

It is home to Aranmore Catholic College, the School of Isolated and Distance Education, North Metropolitan TAFE, Trinity Theological College, and St Mary's Church. The suburb was named after William Henry Leeder, the original grantee of land that encompassed the area.

Notable residents
 Shane Paltridge

See also
 Electoral district of Leederville

References

External links
Leederville Masterplan

 
Suburbs of Perth, Western Australia
Suburbs in the City of Vincent